The History of Assam is the history of a confluence of people from the east, west, south and the north; the confluence of the Austroasiatic, Tibeto-Burman (Sino-Tibetan), Tai and Indo-Aryan cultures. Although invaded over the centuries, it was never a vassal or a colony to an external power until the third Burmese invasion in 1821 and subsequently the British ingress into Assam in 1824 during the First Anglo-Burmese War.

Later documented rulers, and dynasties who are deemed to have ruled a portion of Assam are included in this list.

Ancient Kingdoms (c. 1200 BCE – 500 CE)

Sonitpura Kingdom 

The kingdom was contemporary of Pragjyotisha Kingdom of Kamarupa.

Pragjyotisha Kingdom

Danava dynasty 

First legendary line of rulers in Pragjyotisha. The Danava dynasty consisted of Kirata chiefs; the last of whom, Ghatakasura, was killed and replaced by Naraka.

Known Danava rulers of Pragjyotisha are:
 Mahiranga
 Hatakasura
 Sambarasura
 Ratnasura
 Ghatakasura

Bhauma (Naraka) dynasty 

Second legendary dynasty of Pragjyotisha.
Known Bhauma rulers of Pragjyotisha are:
 Naraka
	Bhagadatta
	Pushpadatta
	Vajradatta

Davaka Kingdom (c. 100 – 500 CE) 

less information is available about this kingdom

Classical Assam : Kamarupa dynesties (350 – 1100 CE)

Varman dynasty (350 – 650 CE) 

The dynastic line as given in the
Dubi copperplate inscription and
Nidhanpur copperplate inscription are as-

The grants of Ratnapala give the list of 21 kings from Salastambha to his line.

Mlechchha dynasty (650 – 900 CE) 

 Salastamba (650–670 CE)
 Vijaya alias Vigrahastambha
 Palaka
 Kumara
 Vajradeva
 Harshadeva alias Harshavarman (725–745 CE)
 Balavarman II
 Jivaraja
 Digleswaravarman
 Salambha
 Harjjaravarman (815–832 CE)
 Vanamalavarmadeva (832–855 CE)
 Jayamala alias Virabahu (855–860 CE)
 Balavarman III (860–880 CE)
 Tyagasimha (890–900 CE)

Pala dynasty (Kamarupa) (900 – 1100 CE) 

 Brahma Pala (900–920 CE)
 Ratna Pala (920–960 CE)
 Indra Pala (960–990 CE)
 Go Pala also Gopalavarman (990–1015 CE)
 Harsha Pala (1015–1035 CE)
 Dharma Pala (1035–1060 CE)
 Jaya Pala (1075–1100 CE)

Medieval Assam

Ahom dynasty (1228 – 1838 CE) 

In the nearly 600-years 39-Swargadeo dynastic history, there are three progenitor kings (all subsequent kings are descendants of these kings).  They are Sukaphaa, who established the kingdom; Suhungmung, who made the greatest territorial and political expansion of the kingdom; and Supaatphaa, who established the House of Tungkhugia kings that reigned the kingdom during its political and cultural zenith, as well as the period of decay and end (except for Jogeswar Singha, who was a descendant of Supaatphaa's father Gobar, and who was installed as a puppet king by the Burmese).

The dynastic history and dates that are accepted today are the result of a re-examination of Ahom and other documents by a team of Nora astronomers and experts who were commissioned to do so by Gaurinath Singha (1780–1795).

Kachari (Dimasa) dynasty (1250 – 1832 CE)

Kamata dynasty (1228/1257 – 1365 CE) 

 Sandhya (1228/1257–1260)
 Sindhu Rai (1260–1285)
 Rup Narayan (1285–1300)
 Singhadhwaj (1300–1305)
 Pratapdhvaj (1305–1325)
 Dharma Narayan (1325–1330)
 Durlabh Narayan (1330–1350)
 Indra Narayan (1350–1365)

Chutia (Sadiya) dynasty (1350 – 1523 CE) 

Known rulers of the Chutia kingdom are:

Nandisvara (late 14th century) 
Satyanarayana (late 14th century) 
Lakshminarayana (early 15th century) 
Dharmanarayana (early 15th century) 
Durlabhnarayana (early 15th century) 
Muktadharmanarayana (mid 15th century) 
Pratyakshanarayana (mid 15th century) 
Yasanarayana (mid 15th century) 
Purandarnarayana (late 15th century) 
Dhirnarayana (unknown – 1524)

Baro-Bhuyan rulers of Assam (1365 – 1440 CE) 

Sasanka or rimatta (1365–1385)
Gajanka (1385–1400)
Sukranka (1400–1415)
Mriganka (1415–1440)

Khen dynasty (1440 – 1498 CE) 

 Niladhwaj (1440–1460)
 Chakradhwaj (1460–1480)
 Nilambar (1480–1498)

Koch dynasty (1515 – 1949 CE)

Rulers of undivided Koch kingdom (1515 – 1586) 
Biswa Singha (1515–1540)
Nara Narayan (1540–1586)

Rulers of Koch Bihar (1586 – 1949) 

 Lakshmi Narayan
 Bir Narayan
 Pran Narayan
 Basudev Narayan
 Mahindra Narayan
 Roop Narayan
 Upendra Narayan
 Devendra Narayan
 Dhairjendra Narayan
 Rajendra Narayan
 Dharendra Narayan
 Harendra Narayan
 Shivendra Narayan
 Narendra Narayan
 Nripendra Narayan
 Rajendra Narayan II
 Jitendra Narayan (father of Gayatri Devi)
 Jagaddipendra Narayan (ruled till 1949)

Rulers of Koch Hajo (1581 – 1616 CE) 

 Raghudev (son of Chilarai, nephew of Nara Narayan)
 Parikshit Narayan

Rulers of Darrang 

 Balinarayan (brother of Parikshit Narayan)
 Mahendra Narayan
 Chandra Narayan
 Surya Narayan

Rulers of Beltola 

Gaj Narayan Dev (brother of Parikshit Narayan, ruler of Koch Hajo, brother of Balinarayan, first Koch ruler of Darrang).
Shivendra Narayan Dev (Son of Gaj Narayan)
Gandharva Narayan Dev (Son of Shivendra Narayan)
Uttam Narayan Dev (Son of Gandharva Narayan Dev)
Dhwaja Narayan Dev (Son of Uttam Narayan Dev)
Jay Narayan Dev (Son of Dhwaja Narayan Dev)
Lambodar Narayan Dev (Son of Jay Narayan Dev)
Lokpal Narayan Dev (Son of Lambodar Narayan Dev)
Amrit Narayan Dev (Son of Lokpal Narayan Dev)
Chandra Narayan Dev (Son of Lokpal Narayan Dev) (died 1910 CE)
Rajendra Narayan Dev (Son of Chandra Narayan Dev) (died 1937 CE)
Lakshmipriya Devi (wife of Rajendra Narayan Dev) (reign:1937–1947 CE died: 1991 CE)

Rulers of Bijni 

The Bijni rulers reigned between the Sankosh and the Manas rivers, the region immediately to the east of Koch Bihar.

 Chandra Narayan (son of Parikshit Narayan)
 Joy Narayan
 Shiv Narayan
 Bijoy Narayan
 Mukunda Narayan
 Haridev Narayan
 Balit Narayan
 Indra Narayan
 Amrit Narayan
 Kumud Narayan
 Jogendra Narayan
 Bhairabendra Narayan

Rulers of Khaspur 

The independent rule of the Khaspur rulers ended in 1745 when it merged with the Kachari kingdom.
  
The rulers of the Koch kingdom at Khaspur are:
 Kamal Narayan (Gohain Kamal, son of Biswa Singha, governor of Khaspur)
 Udita Narayan (declared independence of Khaspur in 1590)
 Vijay Narayana
 Dhir Narayana
 Mahendra Narayana
 Ranjit 
 Nara Singha
 Bhim Singha (his only issue, daughter Kanchani, married a prince of Kachari kingdom, and Khaspur merged with the Kachari kingdom)

Modern Assam : British Colonial Assam (1826 – 1947 CE) 

Chronology of British Colonial regin on Assam-

Bengal Presidency (1826 – 1873 CE)
Chief Commissioner's Province (1874 – 1905 CE)
Eastern Bengal and Assam under Lt. Governor (1906 – 1912 CE)
Assam Legislative Council (1912 – 1920 CE)
Dyarchy (1921 – 1937 CE)
Assam Legislative Assembly (1937 – 1947 CE)

Republic of India 

List of governors of Assam

List of chief ministers of Assam

See also
 History of Assam

References

Rulers
Lists of Indian monarchs